The following is a list of episodes  for the television show Monarch of the Glen.

Series overview

Episodes

Series 1 (2000)

Series 2 (2001)

Series 3 (2001-2002)

Series 4 (2002)

Series 5 (2003)

Series 6 (2004)

Series 7 (2005)

Monarch of the Glen episodes, List of